The Finn-Dorset or Finn Dorset is a British and Irish sheep, a cross-breed of the Finnsheep with the Dorset Horn.  

Dolly the sheep, first mammal to be cloned from an adult somatic cell, was a Finn Dorset.

References

Sheep breeds
Mammal hybrids